Kurdish News Network  (KNN), is a Kurdish language news television network founded in 2008 by Nawshirwan Mustafa, the leader of the Change Movement political party. It is operated by the Wusha Corporation and based in Sulaimaniya.

Programmes 
News - Covering the top Kurdish and international news stories
Headlines - A brief overview of the main news stories
Business - Financial news
Markets - News on the world stock markets and commodity prices
Press - A look at the front pages of various titles every morning
Sport - Top sports stories
Weather - forecasting
Interview - An interview with a noted individual
Debate - A head-to-head debate
Parliament - News about the Kurdish Parliament
Comment - Interviews with thinkers, innovators and opinion leaders

References

External links

 

Television stations in Kurdistan Region (Iraq)
Television stations in Iraq
Kurdish-language television stations
Mass media in Sulaymaniyah
Television channels and stations established in 2008
2008 establishments in Iraqi Kurdistan